Rendezvous in Paris may refer to:

 Rendezvous in Paris (1947 film), a French film directed by Gilles Grangier
 Rendezvous in Paris (1982 film), a French-German film directed by Gabi Kubach
 Rendezvous in Paris (1995 film), a French film directed by Éric Rohmer